Laurel/Whittington Aerodrome  is located  northeast of Laurel, Ontario, Canada.

References

Registered aerodromes in Ontario